The KGB Prison at Leistikowstraße 1 in the German city of Potsdam was a detention centre run by the Soviet counter-intelligence organisation, SMERSH.

Building 
The building was originally built in 1916–18 by the Evangelical Ecclesiastical Benevolent Society (Evangelisch Kirchlichen Hilfsverein) or EKH. After the Potsdam Conference in August 1945 about 100 houses in the Nauener Vorstadt quarter, which bordered on the New Garden, were cordoned off and renamed as Military Camp No. 7 (Militärstädtchen No.7). In this area were located the command centre of the KGB for Germany, which was housed in the former boarding school attended by Empress Augusta Victoria. The neighbouring building of the women's benevolent society (Leistikowstraße 1, previously Mirbachstraße 1) was used as the counter-intelligence detention centre.

History 
Until 1955 Germans were also interned here who were suspected of being active as Werwolf members or of carrying out espionage for the Allied Occupation Powers in the Western Sector of Berlin. Soviet soldiers, who were accused of collaboration, desertion or close contact with the population, were imprisoned here until the mid-1980s. Many inmates were subject to violent interrogation before being sentenced to death or to many years imprisonment and transported to Vorkuta Gulag or other labour camps of the Soviet Gulag system.

At the end of the 1980s the building acted as a storehouse. With the withdrawal of the Red Army from Germany it was returned in 1994 to the Evangelical Ecclesiastical Benevolent Society again. After restoration in 2007/2008 a memorial site was opened on 29 March 2009, which is open to visitors. A permanent exhibition on the history of the detention prison is currently being worked on. The state of Brandenburg, the Federal Republic of Germany and private donors have put up 2.2 million euros for the memorial site.

External links 
 Website of the memorial site
 Website of the memorial site society
 From Potsdam to Vorkuta, publication by the Brandenburg State Office of Political Education, pdf (2002; 1.48 MB)

Buildings and structures in Potsdam
Allied occupation of Germany
Museums in Potsdam
Monuments and memorials in Germany
Prison museums in Germany
Cold War museums in Germany
KGB